Caravan  is a 1934 American musical film released by Fox Film Corporation, directed by Erik Charell, and starring Charles Boyer, Loretta Young, Phillips Holmes and Jean Parker. Fox also produced a French language version of this film, Caravane (1934) starring Boyer, Annabella, and Conchita Montenegro, with Lou Tellegen in a small role.

Plot
The young Countess Wilma (Young) is forced to wed by midnight or lose her inheritance. Wilma impulsively chooses gypsy vagabond Latzi (Boyer), offering him a huge sum of money if he'll consent. Swallowing his pride, Latzi agrees to the marriage, but soon Wilma falls in love with the young Lieutenant Von Tokay (Holmes) who is himself in love with Latzi's gypsy sweetheart Timka (Parker).

Cast
Charles Boyer as Latzi 
Loretta Young as Countess Wilma 
Jean Parker as Timka 
Phillips Holmes as  Lt. von Takay 
Louise Fazenda as  Miss Opitz 
Eugene Pallette as  Gypsy Chief 
C. Aubrey Smith as  Baron von Tokay 
Charley Grapewin as  Notary 
Noah Beery as  Innkeeper 
Dudley Digges as Administrator 
Billy Bevan as  Police Sergeant 
Lionel Belmore as  Station Master
Felix Knight as Gypsy Singer (uncredited)

References

External links

Werner Heymann website

1934 films
1934 musical comedy films
American musical comedy films
American black-and-white films
Films based on short fiction
American multilingual films
Films about Romani people
Films set in Hungary
Films set in the 19th century
1934 multilingual films
Fox Film films
1930s English-language films
Films directed by Erik Charell
1930s American films